Bents is an unincorporated community in Marriott No. 317, Saskatchewan, Canada. Prior to the town founding, the area was referred to as Piche. Bents took its name from Longniddry Bents in Scotland. Its derelict wooden grain elevator was once the subject of a National Geographic photograph. The remnants of the town are now located on private property.

History 
Bents was officially established in 1930 along a CPR rail line that ran between Perdue and Rosetown.  The railway came through the area in 1929 and at one point Bents boasted several residential homes, a small train station, two grain elevators, a dance hall,  a general store (Longworth’s General Store) and post office - all along a single street.  By the 1960s the town began an irreversible decline when the southern section of the rail line was abandoned.  The general store, above which lived the proprietor's family, was in business until the early 1960s.  The railway continued to run through Bents until the 1970s when it too was torn up around 1977. It was at this time that the Saskatchewan Wheat Pool elevator, built in 1928 with the coming of the railway, closed for good.  The United Grain Growers elevator, also built in 1928, was sold to the Wheat Pool in the late 1960s and was also closed and torn down in the 1970s.

Today, little remains.  Only one of the two elevators, the Saskatchewan Wheat Pool elevator, still stands.  There are two houses left. One, belonged to a huge family and the other belonged to an auctioneer.  The general store/post-office is still there but in badly deteriorated condition.   There are random outbuildings and old farm machinery dotting the former town site.  There is also a metal swing-set, missing the swings, sitting alone in the grass beside the general store.  The former town site is now private property and has been the subject of vandalism over the years.  Any visits to Bents must be arranged with the landowner.

Gallery

External links 
 Bents, Ghost town

See also 
 List of communities in Saskatchewan
 List of ghost towns in Saskatchewan

References 

Ghost towns in Saskatchewan
Marriott No. 317, Saskatchewan
Populated places established in 1905
Unincorporated communities in Saskatchewan
1905 establishments in Saskatchewan